Cvetan Čurlinov (born 24 July 1986) is a Macedonian footballer who plays for FK Teteks as a forward.

Career
Curlinov previously played for Kalamata F.C. where he made his debut in the Greek Beta Ethniki coming on as a second-half substitute against Kallithea F.C. on 24 September 2006. He also had a brief spell with FK Žalgiris Vilnius during the 2007 season. The forward joined in January 2010 from FK Pobeda to Macedonian First League rival FK Horizont Turnovo.

In August 2011, he signed a 2-year contract with FK Metalurg Skopje.

References

External links

1986 births
Living people
People from Gevgelija
Association football forwards
Macedonian footballers
North Macedonia under-21 international footballers
FK Pobeda players
FK Makedonija Gjorče Petrov players
Kalamata F.C. players
FK Žalgiris players
FC Baku players
FK Kožuf players
FK Horizont Turnovo players
FK Metalurg Skopje players
FK Rabotnički players
FK Teteks players
FC Wangen bei Olten players
Macedonian First Football League players
Football League (Greece) players
A Lyga players
Azerbaijan Premier League players
Macedonian expatriate footballers
Expatriate footballers in Greece
Macedonian expatriate sportspeople in Greece
Expatriate footballers in Lithuania
Macedonian expatriate sportspeople in Lithuania
Expatriate footballers in Azerbaijan
Macedonian expatriate sportspeople in Azerbaijan
Expatriate footballers in Switzerland
Macedonian expatriate sportspeople in Switzerland